Diana Glauber (11 January 1650, Utrecht – c. 1721, Hamburg), was a Dutch Golden Age painter.

Biography
Born on 11 January 1650, Diana Glauber was a Dutch painter. According to Houbraken she was the daughter of the Amsterdam chemist Johann Rudolph Glauber, and the sister of the painters Jan Gotlief and Johannes Glauber. She was good with portraits and historical allegories, but lost her sight and stopped painting. She was still living in Hamburg while Houbraken was writing.

According to the RKD no works are known, but 6 works are described in a period inventory of the Schloss Salzdahlum, of which five form a series of the five senses.

References

 Diana Glauber on Historici.nl

Notes 

1650 births
1721 deaths
Dutch Golden Age painters
Artists from Utrecht
Dutch women painters
17th-century women artists